The Gāhā Sattasaī or Gāhā Kośa ( Gāthā Saptaśatī) is an ancient collection of Indian poems in Maharashtri Prakrit language. The poems are about love. They are written as frank monologues usually by a married woman, or an unmarried girl. They often express her unrequited feelings and longings to her friend, mother or another relative, lover, husband or to herself. Many poems are notable for describing unmarried girls daring for secret rendezvous to meet boys in ancient India, or about marital problems with husbands who remains emotionally a stranger to his wife and bosses over her, while trying to have affairs with other women.

Gaha Sattasai is one of the oldest known Subhashita-genre text. It deals with the emotions of love, and has been called as "opposite extreme" to Kamasutra. While Kamasutra is a theoretical work on love and sex, Gaha Sattasai is a practical compilation of examples describing "untidy reality of life" where seduction formulae don't work, love seems complicated and emotionally unfulfilling. It also mentioned Radha and Krishna in one of its verse as nayika and nayak respectively.

Authorship and date 

The collection is attributed to the king Hāla who lived in the 1st century. Inside the text, many poems include names of authors, some of which are names of kings from many South Indian particularly Deccan region kingdoms from the first half of the first millennium CE. According to Schelling, one version of the text names 278 poets. 

According to Ram Karan Sharma, this text is from the 1st century CE. According to Ludwik Sternbach, the text was interpolated and revised by later scribes. It is unlikely to be the work of Hala, based on style, inconsistencies between its manuscripts and because other sources state it had as many as 389 authors. Sternbach places the text between 2nd and 4th-century CE. Khoroche and Tieken place the text between 3rd and 4th century CE, but before 640 CE because Banabhatta cites it in his preface to the 4th-century classic Harshacharita.

Manuscripts
The text exists in many versions. Manuscripts have been found in many parts of India in many languages, far from Maharashtra. The existence of many major recensions, states Moriz Winternitz, suggests that the text was very popular by early medieval era in India. The poems were changed over time, sometimes deleted and replaced with different poems, though every manuscript contains exactly 700 poems consistent with the meaning of the title.

The first critical edition of the Sattasaī was by Albrecht Weber in 1881. It is based on seventeen manuscripts, and contains 964 poems in total, of which 430 are common to all manuscripts. Weber was also the first person to translate the poems into a European language (into German), but his translation was published in journals and not as a separate book. The only English translation to include 700 verses (1–700 of Weber's edition) is by Radhagovinda Basak in 1970. There is also a Sanskrit translation of the Sattasaī with commentary, made available by the Rashtriya Sanskrit Sansthan. One of the most important translation of this text along with an elaborate introduction has been done by Sadashiv Atmaram Joglekar in Marathi, published in 1956.

The text was popular across India, and attracted at least fourteen commentaries.

Contents
It consists of 700 single-verse poems, divided into 7 chapters of 100 verses each. All the poems are couplets, and most are in the musical arya metre. Many poems of the text include names of gods and goddesses in Hinduism, for allegorical comparison of a woman's feelings.

Samples

References

Bibliography
 
  Review
 
 
 
Joglekar, Sadashiv Atmaram (1956). Hal Satvahanachi Gatha Saptashati. (Marathi).

External links
 Sanskrit Gatha Saptashati, a Sanskrit translation of the Gaha Sattasai, with commentary
 Hala: Sattasai at GRETIL

Hindu texts
Ancient Indian literature
Poetry anthologies
Love poems
Prakrit literature